The Second North Carolina Provincial Congress was the second extra-legal unicameral body of the North Carolina Provincial Congress that met beginning in 1774.  They were modeled after the colonial lower house (House of Commons).  These congresses created a government structure, issued bills of credit to pay for the movement, and organized an army for defense, in preparation for the state of North Carolina.   These congresses paved the way for the first meeting of the North Carolina General Assembly on April 7, 1777 in New Bern, North Carolina.  The second Congress met in New Bern from April 3 to April 7, 1775.

Legislation
The second congress met at New Bern, from April 3 to 7, 1775. John Harvey served as moderator. The congress met at the same place and almost the same time as the Province of North Carolina General Assembly of 1775 and had almost exactly the same membership (61 of the 107 delegates attended both). This infuriated the royal governor Josiah Martin, who dissolved the colonial legislature on April 8 and never called another.  This congress approved the Continental Association, an economic boycott of Great Britain authorized by the First Continental Congress.  Just after this congress met, news reached North Carolina about the Battle of Lexington and Concord in Massachusetts.  Following this news, Governor Josiah Martin fled and this ended the royal government in the Province.  The first military action occurred on July 18 when patriots burned Fort Johnston, where Governor Martin had transferred his headquarters.

Delegates

Notes:

References

 Provincial Second
Provincial Second
Provincial Second
North Carolina